Exegesis was a group of individuals that delivered the Exegesis Programme through an Exegesis Seminar. The alleged end result of the programme was individual enlightenment, a personal transformation. Founded in 1976 as Infinity Training by Robert D'Aubigny, a former actor, Exegesis ran seminars in the United Kingdom in the later 1970s and early 1980s. Although not in itself a religion or belief, the programme was popularly interpreted as such. The Cult Information Centre categorised it as a "therapy cult", focused on personal and individual development, and George Chryssides categorised it as a self religion.

In the 1970s Robert D’Aubigny remodelled Werner Erhard's controversial EST program into the more UK friendly Exegesis programme while keeping the essence of it unaltered.
Graduates of the programme could attend workshops where a participant worked on personal development while being supported in confronting worst fears. At one time Exegesis claimed to have about 5,000 people in the programme.

Greater interest in the programme led to the group being investigated by the press and becoming the subject of a controversial television play. In 1984 British Members of Parliament raised questions in the House of Commons, to which the Minister of State for Home Affairs David Mellor responded "some organisations and views are deeply repugnant to most sensible people and profoundly wrong-headed and damaging to those drawn into the web of their activities. Nevertheless, unless and until those involved actually break the law, it is difficult for the Government to set their hand against them." The Home Office asked the Metropolitan and Avon and Somerset police to investigate Exegesis. Although the police brought no charges, Exegesis ceased to run seminars around 1984, but re-emerged as a telesales company called Programmes Ltd, which had a turnover of nearly £6.5 million in 1990.

See also
 Human Potential Movement

References

New Age practices
Personal development
Self religions